Omne datum optimum (latin for "Every perfect gift", a quotation from the Epistle of James 1:17) was a papal bull issued by Pope Innocent II on 29 March 1139 that endorsed the Order of the Poor Knights of Christ and of the Temple of Solomon (Knights Templar), in which the Templar Rule was officially approved, and papal protection given.

Background
By the end of the 1130s the Templars had prospered as a complete military order with a stratified structure, due to the efforts of Grand Master Robert de Craon. Already facing ecclesiastical criticism of receiving tithes and alms, Robert de Craon realized the Order could only flourish with papal support. It was during one of Robert's visits to France and Italy, that Innocent II issued the bull Omne datum optimum on 29 March 1139.

Contents
The contents of Omne datum optimum:
promised all spoils from Muslim conquest to the Order
allowed the Order to build churches, cemeteries, and houses
permitted a chaplain in every house
leaders of the Order could expel unworthy members
allowed chapels for members and burials
forbid the election of an outsider as Master of the Order
no homage or tithes were to be extracted from the Order

Included in the contents of the bull was the creation of a group of chaplain brothers for the Order. They were capable of hearing confessions and giving absolution, to all members of the Orders. The Omne datum optimum gave the Order the papal sanction it needed to operate independently of ecclesiastical and secular authorities.

Aftermath
Omne datum optimum was followed by Pope Celestine II's Milites Templi in 1144 and Pope Eugene III's Militia Dei in 1145, which together gave the Templars an extraordinary range of rights and privileges.

See also
Pie postulatio voluntatis, a similar bull that gave papal protection to the Knights Hospitaller

Notes

References

Sources

Knights Templar
1139 works
12th-century papal bulls
Documents of Pope Innocent II